Vasantha Vaidyanathan (1937 – 14 March 2018) was an Indian born Sri Lankan Hindu religious activist and a Tamil radio broadcaster who was well known for her services to the Hindu society as a religious preacher. She has worked as a radio broadcaster for several Hindu religious festivals including the Chariot festivals in the Sri Muthumariamman Temple, Matale. She died on the early morning of 14 March 2018, at a hospital in Colombo, aged 80.

See also 
 List of Sri Lankan broadcasters

References 

1937 births
2018 deaths
Hindu activists
Sri Lankan Tamil radio personalities
Sri Lankan people of Indian descent
Sri Lankan Hindus
People from Mayiladuthurai district